SJK 171, aka Steve the Greek (born c.1957) is a New York City graffiti artist who was active during the late 1960s and 1970s. A native of Washington Heights, he was a founding member of United Graffiti Artists, one of the first professional graffiti collectives.

History 
SJK 171 attended the High School of Art and Design along with a number of other early graffiti artists, and began writing in 1968 under the name SJK 171.  His work was the first triple outline, large colorful letters to appear on the 1 Line of the New York City Transit System.  Some sources have recognized him as a graffiti pioneer and also for originating the "squiggly lines" style of outlining graffiti. In early 1971, he began to use the "swiggly radiant energy lines" later popularized by Keith Haring. SJK 171 is also credited with pioneering the use of arrows in graffiti writing around this same time.  In 1973, SJK 171 was featured in a New York Magazine essay on graffiti art by Richard Goldstein.

Gallery and show appearances 
1973: A collaborative mural bearing SJK 171's tag, along with those of PHASE 2 and a dozen other early graffiti artists, was the main attraction at a gallery show of graffiti art at Razor Gallery in SoHo. SJK 171 was also one of several graffiti writers featured in the backdrop design for the Joffery Ballet's production of Deuce Coupe.

2014: SJK 171's work is included in the permanent collection of The Museum of the City of New York.

2018-2019: SJK 171 was included in "Beyond the Streets", a street art exhibition displayed in Los Angeles and New York.

References

Further reading 
Chandès, Hervé. Born in the Streets, Fondation Cartier pour l'art contemporain, 2006, .
Gastman, Roger. The History of American Graffiti, HarperCollins, 2011, .
Deitch, Jeffrey. Art in The Streets, Rizzoli International Publications, 2011, .
Gastman, Roger. Wall Writers: Graffiti in Its Innocence, Gingko Press, 2015, .

Street art
Graffiti and unauthorised signage
Photographers from New York City
American graffiti artists
People from Washington Heights, Manhattan
Year of birth uncertain
Living people
Year of birth missing (living people)